Sikkim Sangram Parishad is a regional political party in the Indian state of Sikkim. In 1979, after a period of instability, a ministry headed by Nar Bahadur Bhandari from Sikkim Janata Parishad party gained power in Sikkim. In 1984, Bhandari dissolved Sikkim Janata Parishad and formed a new party called Sikkim Sangram Parishad. Sikkim Sangram Parishad held on to power in the 1984 and 1989 elections, but after that lost to Sikkim Democratic Front, which has swept the elections since 1999. Sikkim Sangram Parishad did not win any seats in the state assembly in the 2004 elections. Nar Bahadur Bhandari has merged Sikkim Sangram Parishad with the Indian National Congress and he became the president of the Sikkim Pradesh Congress Committee (SPCC).

In 2013, Nar Bahadur Bhandari revived the Sikkim Sangram Parishad again.

This party had won state election two times in 1984 and 1989.

Electoral records 
 Sikkim Legislative Assembly election

 Lok Sabha election, Sikkim

References 

Political parties in Sikkim
Political parties established in 1984
1984 establishments in Sikkim